Coleophora intermixta is a moth of the family Coleophoridae. It is found in Mongolia.

References

intermixta
Moths described in 1976
Moths of Asia